Victor Robert (born 1863, date of death unknown) was a Belgian sports shooter. He competed at the 1900, 1920 and the 1924 Summer Olympics.

References

External links
 

1863 births
Year of death missing
Belgian male sport shooters
Olympic shooters of Belgium
Shooters at the 1900 Summer Olympics
Shooters at the 1920 Summer Olympics
Shooters at the 1924 Summer Olympics
Place of birth missing
Date of birth missing
Place of death missing